Region Business is a business-oriented advocacy association in the greater Sacramento region. The organization is a coalition of trade associations (Region Builders, Region Restaurants, Region Technology) under the umbrella of Region Business.

History 
Region Business was founded in 2011 as Region Builders, a political action committee of the Sacramento Regional Builders Exchange. The organization became a separate trade association in 2012. In 2015, the organization re-branded from a building industry trade association to a business advocacy association.

Policy Positions taken 
 Supported the Sacramento City Downtown Arena.   
 Opposed a proposed $15 minimum wage in Sacramento City (Region Restaurants, Region Builders).
 Supporting zero-percent loans for new restaurants (Region Restaurants).
 Supported one-day building permit program called Permit Simplicity (Region Builders).
 Opposed proposed soda tax in the City of Davis (Region Restaurants).
 Supporting Downtown Soccer Stadium project (Region Business).
 Supported bidding preferences on public projects for local contractors (Region Builders).
 Supported creation of clean energy property investment (Region Builders).
 Supported approval of Cordova Hills development project (Region Builders).
 Supported the repeal of the Sacramento City Big Box "Superstore" Ordinance (Region Builders).
 Opposed efforts by the Sacramento Area Council of Governments to remove local control on development project decisions (Region Builders).

Electoral activities 
 Supported Garrett Gatewood for Rancho Cordova City Council 
Supported Darrell Steinberg for Mayor of Sacramento City (2016)
 Supported Gary Davis for Mayor of Elk Grove (2012)
 Opposed Loomis Mayor Sandra Calvert's re-election (2014).
 Opposed Measure M & O in El Dorado County (2014).

Sacramento City Downtown Arena  
Spearheaded the pro-arena effort for the Golden 1 Center. Filed the FPPC complaint that uncovered Chris Hansen as secret funder for STOP anti-arena campaign, collected 15,000 petition withdrawals (the most in California State History) to successfully block STOP measure from the ballot, and ran the DowntownArena.org and The4000 arena coalitions.

Current & past leadership  
Info from official website.
 Chet Fite - Board President - 2018-2020
David Temblador - Board President - 2015–2017
 Ron Brown - Board President - 2014
 Mike Kimmel - Board President - 2013
 Bill Porter - Founder, Board President - 2011–2012
 Scott Maxwell, Founder - 2011
 Tim Fry, Founder - 2011
 Joshua Wood (Smiling Assassin) - Founder, Chief Executive Officer (2011–Present)

Affiliate organizations 
 Region Builders
 Region Technology
 Region Restaurants
 the Economic Growth Institute

References 

Political advocacy groups in the United States
Organizations established in 2011
501(c)(6) nonprofit organizations